On July 28, 2014 the Fourth Circuit Court of Appeals upheld a ruling in Bostic v. Schaefer striking down Virginia's same-sex marriage ban which is a precedent for every state within the circuit. The ruling would have gone into effect on August 21, 2014 but the Supreme Court of the United States granted the stay request by the clerk of Prince William County. Attorneys for two same-sex couples had until August 18, 2014 to respond to the stay request. The Fourth Circuit consists of Maryland, North Carolina, South Carolina, Virginia, and West Virginia. Maryland was the first state in the circuit to enact gay marriage by legislative act and confirmed by a voter referendum. That occurred prior to the Fourth Circuit Court ruling that was denied review at the Supreme Court, which led to same-sex marriage expansion to Virginia, West Virginia, and North Carolina.

North Carolina Attorney General Roy Cooper announced soon after the ruling that he would no longer defend NC's ban on same-sex unions in court, saying "Our office believes the judges in North Carolina are bound by this 4th Circuit decision," he said. "In addition, the State of North Carolina will acknowledge the 4th Circuit opinion that marriage is a fundamental right."

On August 8, 2014, Virginia Attorney General Mark Herring asked the United States Supreme Court to review the Fourth Circuit's decision. Even though Herring supports marriage for same-sex couples, he asked for review because "[t]he question presented is vital to a large population of same-sex couples, to their children, and to their fellow Americans who believe that discriminating against gay people is both unfair and unconstitutional. They may fairly call this 'the defining civil rights issue of our time.'"

On October 6, 2014, the Supreme Court denied certiorari for the appeal, making the Fourth Circuit's decision final.  Virginia promptly began solemnizing same-sex marriages.

On November 20, 2014, the Supreme Court declined to issue a stay on a lower District Court ruling overturning South Carolina's same-sex marriage ban, removing all legal obstacles to same-sex marriage in South Carolina.

Same-sex marriage is legal in every state within the circuit.

See also
Same-sex marriage
Same-sex marriage in the United States
Same-sex marriage in the Ninth Circuit
Same-sex marriage in the Seventh Circuit
Same-sex marriage in the Tenth Circuit
Same-sex marriage in the Sixth Circuit

References

United States Court of Appeals for the Fourth Circuit
4